King of Queens is the debut studio album by Nigerian singer Yemi Alade. It was released by Effyzzie Music Group on 2 October 2014. Yemi Alade collaborated with producers such as Selebobo, Sizzle Pro, Shady Bizniz, Philkeyz, Young D, GospelOnDeBeatz, DIL, OJB Jezreel, Mr Chidoo, Fliptyce, EL Mcee and Beat Nation. The album's release was preceded by three singles—"Johnny", "Tangerine" and "Kissing". It features guest appearances and skits from Bovi, R2Bees, Phyno, Chidinma, DIL, Selebobo and Diamond Platnumz. Yemi Alade promoted the album by touring several African countries, including Ghana, Kenya and South Africa. The album's deluxe edition was released in November 2014, and contains French versions of songs originally performed in English. Its cover art was unveiled on 21 October 2014. According to the music platform A Nation of Billions, King of Queens sold over 100,000 copies.

Background and composition
Yemi Alade recorded the album between 2013 and 2014. In May 2014, Effyzzie Music Group revealed the album's title and told Nigeria Entertainment Today that it would be released in July 2014. The Daily Times of Nigeria later reported that the album would be released in September 2014. Yemi Alade collaborated with producers such as Selebobo, Sizzle Pro, Shady Bizniz, Philkeyz, Young D, GospelOnDeBeatz, DIL, OJB Jezreel, Mr Chidoo, Fliptyce, EL Mcee and Beat Nation. King of Queens release was preceded by three singles—"Johnny", "Tangerine" and "Kissing". The album features guest appearances and skits from Bovi, R2Bees, Phyno, Chidinma, DIL, Selebobo and Diamond Platnumz. Yemi Alade promoted the album by touring several African countries, including Ghana, Kenya and South Africa. The album's deluxe edition was released in November 2014 and contains French versions of songs originally performed in English. Its cover art was unveiled on 21 October 2014. According to the music platform A Nation of Billions, King of Queens sold over 100,000 copies.

King of Queens is a mixture of Afropop, reggae and R&B. In the slow-tempo reggae track "Why", Yemi Alade explores her versatility. She infuses her personality in "Pose". "Duro Timi" is an R&B song with a pop undertone. In the slow cuddle  song "Catch You", Yemi Alade creates sexual rhythm and raps towards the end. "Money" is a reincarnation of "Johnny". Hausa vibes are included on "I Like". "Sugar" is an electro pop song, while "Fall in Love" is a ballad that pays tribute to R&B of the 80s.

Singles
The Selebobo-produced track "Johnny" was released on 14 October 2013 as the album's lead single. The music video for "Johnny" was uploaded to Yemi Alade's Vevo channel on 3 March 2014. It was directed in Ogun State by Clarence Peters and features cameo appearances from Bovi, Alexx Ekubo and Beverly Osu. The French version of "Johnny" was released on 20 May 2014 and was included as a bonus on the album. By releasing the song, Yemi Alade became the first Nigerian musician to release a song entirely performed in French.

The album's second single "Tangerine" was released on 14 April 2014. The song was also produced by Selebobo. The accompanying music video for "Tangerine" was also directed by Clarence Peters; it was uploaded to Vevo on 8 July 2014. Prior to releasing the video, Effyzzie Music Group unveiled footage and shots from the video shoot. The album's third single "Kissing" was released on 10 September 2014. It was produced by Fliptyce and is considered a groovy mid-tempo love song. On 16 October 2014, Effyzzie Music Group released the music video for "Kissing", which was directed by Sesan in London.

"Taking Over Me" was released as the album's fourth single. Its music video was directed by Justin Campos and Taiye Aliyu.  On 13 March 2015 Yemi Alade released the album's fifth single "Temperature"; the song features vocals by British-Nigerian singer DIL. The accompanying music video for "Temperature" was directed by Ovié Étseyatsé. "Duro Timi" was released as the album's sixth single. Its music video was shot and directed in London by Ova.

Critical reception

King of Queens received generally mixed reviews from music critics. Ayomide Tayo of Pulse Nigeria awarded the album 3.5 stars out of 5, praising Yemi Alade for "stamping her authority on so many genres" and commending her for "crafting local pop tracks and delivering slow love songs with a regal glow." Al Yhusuff and Jim Donnett granted the album 3 stars out of 5, calling it "decent" and saying "pressures and some careless choices might have swayed a couple of decisions" on it.

Accolades
King of Queens was nominated for Best R&B/Pop Album and Album of the Year at The Headies 2015. The album was also nominated for Album of the Year at the 2015 Nigeria Entertainment Awards.

Track listing

Notes
"—" denotes a skit

Personnel
Credits adapted from the back cover of King of Queens.

Yemi Alade – primary artist, writer, performer
Koribo Harrison – executive producer
Taiye Aliyu – executive producer
Tpiano – mixing, mastering
Clu Briz – mixing, mastering
Selebobo – featured artist, writer, production, mixing, mastering
Sizzle Pro – production, mixing, mastering
Shady Bizniz – production, mixing, mastering
Philkeyz – production, mixing, mastering
Young D – production, mixing, mastering
GospelOnDeBeatz – production, mixing, mastering
DIL – featured artist, writer, production, mixing, mastering
OJB Jezreel – production
Mr Chidoo – production
Fliptyce – production
EL Mcee – production
Beat Nation – production
Bovi Ugboma – skit
R2Bees – featured artist, writer
Azubuike Nelson – featured artist, writer
Chidinma Ekile – featured artist, writer
Nasibu Juma – featured artist, writer
August Udoh – photography
UnravelGfx – album art

Release history

References

2014 debut albums
Yoruba-language albums
Igbo-language albums
Albums produced by GospelOnDeBeatz
Albums produced by OJB Jezreel
Albums produced by Mr Chidoo
Albums produced by Selebobo
Yemi Alade albums
Albums produced by Shady Bizniz
Albums produced by Fliptyce